Dyspeptic may refer to

Relating to or having dyspepsia
Having or displaying a morose or melancholic temperament